D402 is a state road connecting D66 state road to Brestova ferry port, from where ferries fly to Porozina, Cres and D100 state road. The road is 3.2 km long.

The road, as well as all other state roads in Croatia, is managed and maintained by Hrvatske ceste, state owned company.

Traffic volume 

There are no official published data on volume of traffic carried by the D402 road, however, Hrvatske ceste, the operator of the road, publishes information on average annual daily traffic (AADT) and average summer daily traffic (ASDT) carried by Brestova - Porozina ferry line, connecting D402 and D100 state roads. It may be safely concluded that traffic carried by D402 at least matches those figures.

Road junctions and populated areas

Sources

State roads in Croatia
Transport in Istria County